CO3 or Co3 may refer to:

 Carbon trioxide
 Carbonate
 MT-CO3
 A postcode district in Colchester, UK
 Conway group Co3 in mathematics
 Co3, Australian contemporary dance company listed in Australian contemporary dance
 Company 3
 Colorado's 3rd congressional district